Special Branch is a British television series made by Thames Television for ITV and shown between 1969 and 1974. A police drama series, the action was centred on members of the Special Branch anti-espionage and anti-terrorist department of the London Metropolitan Police.

Production
The first two series were shot mainly in a studio on videotape with filmed location inserts; a standard method of the time but one which suffered from jarring differences in picture quality between interior and exterior scenes. The location scenes of some episodes were shot on outside broadcast cameras, leading to smoother transitions between location and studio work for those episodes. Series 1 and 2 starred Derren Nesbitt as Detective Chief Inspector (DCI) Jordan, working to Detective Superintendent Eden (Wensley Pithey) and subsequently Det. Supt. Inman (Fulton Mackay). The episodes featuring Eden (the first nine of Series 1) were recorded in black and white, while all subsequent episodes were recorded on colour videotape.

The show was revamped in 1973 after Thames Television's Euston Films subsidiary took over production using film, which allowed for a less studio-based series. Euston Films had pioneered the technique of shooting action and adventure series entirely on location using 16mm film, for a more gritty and realistic look. These episodes starred George Sewell as DCI Alan Craven and Roger Rowland as Bill North. In series 3 episode 2, Patrick Mower debuted as Craven's colleague and often antagonist, DCI Tom Haggerty. By the 1974 series Bill North had been axed, having had a nervous breakdown, though he returned for one episode later in the run as a Detective Inspector in CID.

Representing the Ministry in the first two series was Moxon, and later Strand, who appeared in the fourth series. Played by Morris Perry and Paul Eddington respectively, Moxon and Strand were similar: supercilious civil servants who kept an unwanted eye on the detectives and their budgets. They sometimes manipulated them in order to pursue obscure matters of state, such as in the first series episode "Reliable Sources", where Moxon connives to have Eden sidelined into a Home Office working party role.

The theme music for series 1 was by Norman Kay. For series 2, 3 and 4 it was by Robert Sharples under the pseudonym Robert Earley.

The 1973/74 series of this police drama is notable for being the first production by Euston Films, later responsible for such series as The Sweeney and Minder. The influence on The Sweeney is clear, although the rough-and-tumble nature of that show is fairly lacking in Special Branch.

Both Sewell and Mower later starred as villains in The Sweeney, while Sweeney star Dennis Waterman appeared in the 1974 Special Branch episode "Stand and Deliver" as a criminal. Mower later went on to star in the 1977–78 BBC police series Target.

The 1973 and 1974 series have been released on Region Two DVD by Network, and both sets include an episode from the original Thames TV series. The 1969 series was released as a four-disc DVD set by Network in January 2007, and the 1970 series was released as a Website Exclusive in November 2007. All four series were released on DVD by Network in 2008, in a 16-disc box-set featuring all 53 episodes.  The 1973 series was released on Region One DVD by Acorn, which labelled it "set one".

As with the later The Sweeney, the on-screen offices of Special Branch were located in Hammersmith.

Filming locations
Multiple episodes of Special Branch used Ennismore Garden Mews, SW7, as a filming location.

Cast
 Derren Nesbitt as Detective Chief Inspector Elliot Jordan (27 episodes, 1969–1970)
 George Sewell as Detective Chief Inspector Alan Craven (25 episodes, 1973–1974)
 Morris Perry as Charles Moxon (22 episodes, 1969–1970)
 Fulton Mackay as Detective Chief Superintendent Alec Inman (18 episodes, 1969–1970)
 Patrick Mower as Detective Chief Inspector Tom Haggerty (16 episodes, 1973–1974)
 Roger Rowland as Detective Sergeant Bill North (15 episodes, 1969–1974)
 Keith Washington as Detective Constable John Morrissey (15 episodes, 1969–1970)
 Paul Eddington as Strand (11 episodes, 1974)
 Frederick Jaeger as Commander Fletcher (9 episodes, 1970–1974)
 Wensley Pithey as Detective Superintendent Eden (9 episodes, 1969)
 David Garth as Deputy Commander (7 episodes, 1969–1970)
 Sheila Scott Wilkinson as Pam Sloane (7 episodes, 1973)
 Paul Antrim as Detective Sergeant Maguire (7 episodes, 1974)
 Sandra Bryant as Christine Morris (6 episodes, 1969–1970)
 Jennifer Wilson as Detective Sergeant Helen Webb (6 episodes, 1969)
 Richard Leech as Chief Superintendent Knight (5 episodes, 1973–1974)
 Anne Rutter as Detective Constable Jane Simpson (4 episodes, 1970)
 Susan Jameson as Detective Sergeant Mary Holmes (4 episodes, 1974)
 Peter Jeffrey as Chief Inspector Pettiford (1 episode, 1973)

Guest appearances 
Notable actors appearing included: Paul Darrow ("Short Change"), Dino Shafeek and Windsor Davies ("The Promised Land"), Garfield Morgan and Rula Lenska ("Something About a Soldier"), Jacqueline Pearce ("Catherine the Great"), Cyd Hayman ("Rendezvous"), Susan Jameson as Detective Sergeant Mary Holmes ("Date of Birth", "Intercept", and "Downwind of Angels"), John Bindon ("Intercept"), Peter Bowles and Janet Key ("Downwind of Angels"), Nicolette McKenzie ("Diversion"), Denis Lill ("Diversion"), Kenneth Colley ("Date of Birth"), Valerie Leon ("Sounds Sinister") June Brown ("Entente Cordiale"), Annette Crosbie ("The Other Man"), Michael Gambon and Nadim Sawalha, ("Hostage"), Dennis Waterman and Stephanie Turner (as brother and sister in "Stand and Deliver"), Stephanie Beacham ("Threat"), Richard Marner ("Polonaise"), Roger Lloyd Pack ("Red Herring"), Gareth Thomas ("Alien"), Tony Haygarth ("You Won't Remember Me") and Walter Gotell ("Intercept").

Episodes

Series Overview

Series 1: 17 September 1969 to 17 December 1969 (14 Episodes)
Series 2: 11 August 1970 to 4 November 1970 (13 Episodes)
Series 3: 4 April 1973 to 4 July 1973 (13 Episodes)
Series 4: 14 February 1974 to 9 May 1974 (13 Episodes)

Series 1 (1969) 
 
 
 
Note: Episodes 1-9 were made in black & white, colour from episode 10 onwards

Series 2 (1970)

Series 3 (1973)

Series 4 (1974)

References

External links

External links
 
 

Lists of British crime television series episodes
1960s British crime television series
1970s British crime television series
Espionage television series
ITV television dramas
Television shows set in London
1969 British television series debuts
1974 British television series endings
1960s British drama television series
1970s British drama television series
English-language television shows
Television shows produced by Thames Television
Television series by Fremantle (company)
Television series by Euston Films
British detective television series
Television shows shot at Teddington Studios